Gökmusa is a village in the Balya district of Balıkesir province in Turkey.

References

Villages in Balya District